Jean Garaïalde (born 2 October 1934) is a French professional golfer.

Garaïalde was born in Ciboure, Pyrénées-Atlantiques. He turned professional in 1952. In 1969, he became the first French golfer since Firmin Cavalo in 1948 to claim his own national open. Around that time, he won several other national opens around Europe, including the German Open in 1969 and 1970 and the Spanish Open also in 1969.

In his home country, Garaïalde was dominant winning 12 French PGA titles between 1960 and 1982, including seven in a row from 1962, 17 French Native Opens between 1957 and 1987, and 12 French Professional Championships between 1968 and 1985.

Garaïalde represented France in the World Cup a record 25 times. He retired shortly after his final appearance in 1982, although he has since played in several European, Challenge and European Seniors Tour events that have been held in France. In 1992 he won the Turespaña Léman International Senior Trophy in Switzerland, and tied for 11th in the Senior British Open Championship.

Professional wins (63)
This list may be incomplete

Safari Circuit wins (1)
1987 Ivory Coast Open

European wins (6)
1969 French Open, Spanish Open, German Open, Omnium de la Côte Basque
1970 German Open, Volvo Open

French wins (54)
1951 Omnium de Saint-Jean-de-Luz
1952 Omnium de Biarritz
1953 Omnium de Valescure, Omnium de Monte-Carlo
1957 French Native Open
1958 French Native Open
1960 French PGA Championship
1962 French PGA Championship, French Native Open
1963 French PGA Championship, French Native Open
1964 French PGA Championship, French Native Open
1965 French PGA Championship, French Native Open, Omnium International d'Evian
1966 French PGA Championship, French Native Open
1967 French PGA Championship, French Native Open
1968 French PGA Championship, Championnat de France Pro
1969 French Native Open, Championnat de France Pro
1970 French PGA Championship, French Native Open, Championnat de France Pro
1971 French PGA Championship, French Native Open, Championnat de France Pro
1972 French Native Open, Championnat de France Pro
1973 French Native Open
1974 French Native Open, Championnat de France Pro
1975 French Native Open, Championnat de France Pro
1976 French Native Open, Championnat de France Pro, Inter Maritime
1977 Championnat de France Pro
1978 Challenge Novotel, Inter Maritime
1979 French PGA Championship
1980 Championnat de France Pro, French Match Play Championship, Challenge Novotel, Inter Maritime
1981 Trophée GSL Texas Institute
1982 French PGA Championship, Championnat de France Pro, Rover Grand Prix, Cannes-Mougins Open
1985 Championnat de France Pro
1987 French Native Open

Other wins (1)
1969 Moroccan Open

European Senior Tour wins (1)

Results in major championships

Note: Garaïalde only played in the Masters Tournament and The Open Championship.

CUT = missed the half-way cut
"T" indicates a tie for a place

Team appearances
World Cup (representing France): 1954, 1955, 1957, 1958, 1960, 1961, 1962, 1963, 1964, 1965, 1966, 1967, 1968, 1970, 1971, 1972, 1973, 1974, 1975, 1976, 1977, 1978, 1979, 1980, 1982
Joy Cup (representing the Rest of Europe): 1954, 1955, 1958
Marlboro Nations' Cup/Philip Morris International (representing France): 1972, 1973, 1975 (winners), 1976
Double Diamond International (representing Continental Europe): 1973
Sotogrande Match/Hennessy Cognac Cup (representing the Continent of Europe): 1974, 1976, (representing France) 1984

References

External links

French male golfers
European Tour golfers
European Senior Tour golfers
French-Basque people
Sportspeople from Pyrénées-Atlantiques
People from Labourd
1934 births
Living people